The Deputy Prime Minister of the Republic of Yemen  is the deputy head of government of Yemen.

According to the Constitution of Yemen, the Deputy Prime Minister is appointed by the President.

Last former Deputies Prime Ministers of Yemen are Ahmed al-Maisari and Ahmed Saeed al-Khanbashi.

References

External links
- Rulers

Government of Yemen
History of Yemen